Dahyan, sometimes rendered as Dhahyan or Duhyan, is a town in Saada Governorate in north-western Yemen. It is the birthplace of Badreddin al-Houthi, father of Hussein Badreddin al-Houthi. During the Saudi Arabian-led intervention in Yemen the town was the location of the Dahyan air strike, in which a Saudi Air Force jet dropped a 227 kg (500 lb) laser-guided Mk 82 bomb on a school bus full of young children driving through a crowded marketplace, which killed more than 50 people, most of whom were children.

References

Populated places in Saada Governorate